"Dine and dash" is the US phrase for a form of theft, typically in which a patron or patrons order and consume food and beverages from a restaurant or similar establishment with the intent not to pay. The act usually involves the client placing an order for a meal, consuming the meal, and then exiting the establishment before or after being presented with the bill. Less commonly, the act can involve the patron eating the food and then afterward stating to a restaurant employee that they do not have the funds to pay for what they purchased.

Legal aspects 
In English law, "food" falls under the crime of making off without payment introduced in 1978; the law was later copied in Northern Ireland and the Republic of Ireland. Simply failing to pay a bill when due is generally not a crime in most United States circumstances or jurisdictions. It is a contract debt, and the act is civil rather than criminal in nature.  However, there are often laws that apply specifically to restaurants, hotels, and other circumstances, where the presumption is that the customer intended to never pay their bill in advance and therefore obtained the valuable services under false pretenses, a form of criminal fraud. In certain states, dining and dashing is not labelled as a criminal issue. in Mississippi, it is a felony offense to refuse to pay a bill over $25.00. In one case, Paul Guadalupe Gonzales, who became known as the "Dine-and-Dash Dater", was arrested and charged with 10 felonies after 13 women came forward about his actions.

Sometimes the establishment may make their employees pay the cost of customer theft to give them an incentive to police their customers. They may do so explicitly by deducting unpaid meals from wages or tips, or implicitly through an end-of-shift reconciliation system whereby the server is expected to provide enough cash and credit card receipts to cover the cost of their customers' meals, and keeps any surplus as tips. In some locales, this is an illegal form of wage theft, and if the server is held responsible for tabs that are not paid, the employer is liable for paying back the server's stolen wages.

In Michigan and many other states, "defrauding an innkeeper" is a specialized statutory misdemeanor offense, with a maximum penalty of 93 days in jail and a fine of up to $500 and possible probation for up to 2 years.  It can be charged either under state law or local ordinance.  The gravamen of this offense involves failure to pay an incurred bill at a bar, cafe, hotel, motel or restaurant with intent to defraud the business establishment.

See also 
 Democracy Manifest video
 List of restaurant terminology
 Freddie the Freeloader's Christmas Dinner

References 

Theft
Restaurant terminology
Food law
Deception